Forgotten Sunrise is an Estonian industrial/deathbeat band founded in Tallinn, the capital of Estonia. Their sound has been compared to a mixture of Dead Can Dance, David Lynch, Katatonia, Celtic Frost and Clock DVA.

History

1992–1994
Forgotten Sunrise was formed in summer 1992 as the result of common interest of Anders Melts and Jan Talts to make death metal in Estonia. Two friends with previous experiences, Margus Gustavson and Tarvo Valm, joined the yet unnamed band. After six months and having their first songs, in 1993 a demo “Behind The Abysmal Sky” was recorded. A few months later, a contract with a Finnish label, Rising Realm Records, was signed and by the end of the year the “Forever Sleeping Greystones” mini-CD had been recorded. The mini-album was released at the end of 1994. The band attracted a great deal of attention and played concerts until differences caused the drummer and the guitarist to leave the band.

1996–1999
With Renno Süvaoja and Tiiu Kiik joining the group, computers were now a part of the process of making the music. In the meantime the band's style had progressed and in 1996, Forgotten Sunrise basically started from the beginning. A period of studies and experimenting followed until Forgotten Sunrise was again ready for the stage.

In 1997, they appeared with a new sound. Though old atmospheric death metal was mixed with trip hop, techno, folk and drum'n'bass merged with shoegaze and indie-pop, the dreary grim atmosphere and severe message were still intact. With the style the group itself called Deathbeat, the first promotional CD was out in 1999 and a self-released mini-album “a.Nimal f.Lesh" in 2000.

2003–2008
Forgotten Sunrise signed a two album contract with the Italian label, My Kingdom Music. The first album, Ru:mipu:dus, was released in January 2004 and before that a full-length single “Ple:se Disco-Nnect Me” was given out. The album received positive reviews. In 2005, the track “Never(k)now” was given out as a promotional single.

The second album, Willand, was recorded in fall 2005 and was released in spring 2007.
 
In 2006, Gerty Villo joined the band with keyboards and female vocals. In 2007, Pavel Torpan joined with guitars and Different Knots of Ropelove, a 12 track remix CD (including remixes by Alec Empire, Pehr Herb, Darkmen etc.), was released.

2009
A full-length CD-single, "The Moments When God Was Wrong", was self-released and the demo tape "Behind The Abysmal Sky" with a mini-CD "Forever Sleeping Greystones" with 7 live bonus tracks was re-released on CD.

2010
Ragnar Kivi joined the band with electronic drums.

Members

Present members
Anders "Kuratino" Melts - vocals, bass, percussions, programming
Kadri Sammel - keyboards, vocals, bass, programming, visuals

Former members
Gerty Villo – keyboards, female vocals
Pavel Torpan – guitars
Ragnar Kivi - electronic drums
Andrey Voinov – bass guitar
Ott Evestus – drums
Margus "George" Aro – keyboards
Andrus Valtenberg – electronic instruments
Jan Talts – bass guitar
Keijo Koppel – guitar
Margus "Kusti" Gustavson – guitar
Meelis Looveer – programming
Renno Süvaoja – guitar
Riivo Torstenberg – bass guitar
Tarvo Valm – drums
Tiiu Kiik – female vocals, keyboards

Discography
Behind The Abysmal Sky (1993) demo tape
Forever Sleeping Greystones (1994) mini-CD
Forgotten Sunrise (1999) mini-CD
a.Nimal f.Lesh – Looma Liha (2000) mini-CD
Ple:se Disco-Nnect Me (2003) full-length single
Ru:mipu:dus (2004) album
Never(k)now (2005) single
Willand (2007) album
Different Knots of Ropelove (2007) full-length single
Behind The Abysmal Sky / Forever Sleeping Greystones (2009) re-release
The Moments When God Was Wrong (2009) full-length single
Time Flies - Rare and Unreleased 1992-2012 (2012) compilation
Cretinism (2013) album
Guardian Curtains (2016) single

References

External links
 Official website
 

Industrial rock musical groups
Estonian musical groups
Musical groups established in 1992
Estonian musical trios